Gold Snatchers,, is a 1973 Hong Kong action martial arts film directed by Lung Chien,  and starring Yasuaki Kurata.

Plot 

Chen Sing and Ah Fat come out of jail and go to Chen's stepmother's grave to find a chest of gold to steal. Chan searches for the gold the Delinquents have stolen, only to later discover that he was framed by his half-brother Lung Fei.

Cast

 Sing Chen
 Yasuaki Kurata
 Shen-Lin Chen
 Ying Fung Chen
 Ming Chin
 Ming-Shao Ho
 Wei-Hsiung Ho
 Blackie Shou-Liang Ko

References

External links

1970 films
1970 martial arts films
1970s action films
1970s martial arts films
1970s Cantonese-language films
Films shot in Hong Kong
Hong Kong action films
Hong Kong films about revenge
Hong Kong martial arts films
Kung fu films
1970s Mandarin-language films
Films directed by Lung Chien
1970s Hong Kong films